This is a list of web analytics software used to collect and display data about visiting website users.

Self-hosted software

Free / Open source (FLOSS)
This is a comparison table of web analytics software released under a free software license.

Proprietary
This is a comparison table of web analytics proprietary software.

Hosted / Software as a service
This is a comparison table of hosted web analytics software as a service.

References

External links 
 

Web analytics
Web software
Lists of software